The Palni Hills ground skink (Kaestlea palnica) is a species of skink found in India.

References

Kaestlea
Reptiles described in 1892
Taxa named by Oskar Boettger